A songthaew is a passenger vehicle in Thailand and Laos adapted from a pick-up or a larger truck and used as a share taxi or bus.

Overview
The songthaew takes its name from the two bench seats fixed along either side of the back of the truck; in some vehicles a third bench is put down the middle of the seating area.  Additionally a roof is fitted over the rear of the vehicle, to which curtains and plastic sheeting to keep out rain may be attached. Some vehicles have roofs high enough to accommodate standing passengers within the vehicle. More typically, standing passengers occupy a platform attached to the rear.

In Chiang Mai and its surroundings, locals may call them rot si daeng (literally "car red" – a reference to their most common colour in the area, Thai รถสีแดง), rot daeng, or sometimes si rot.

The Isuzu Faster and Toyota Hilux are example models of songthaews found in Thailand.

History
Songthaew introduced in Thailand in 1950s. Early songthaews using Austin A30 sedans.

In 1960s, songthaews used various models like Leyland 15/20, Morris 250 JU, Morris J4 and Morris Minor.

Use
Songthaews are used both within towns and cities and for longer routes between towns and villages. Those within towns are converted from pick-up trucks and usually travel fixed routes for a set fare, but in some cases (as in Chiang Mai) they are used as shared taxis for passengers traveling in roughly the same direction.

Vehicles on longer routes may be converted from larger trucks for about forty passengers.

In Phuket Province, there are several Songthaew (blue wooden buses) services which connect the beach resorts with Phuket Town. The routes operate around every 30 minutes from Ranong Road in Phuket starting at around 06:00 and finishing at around 17:00 (from each end of the route). The price is typically around 50 baht single fare. The bus will stop anywhere along the route and is hailed down by waving. These include the following routes:

Routes
 Phuket Town – Choengtalay (for Bangtao Beach & Laguna Resort) – Surin Beach – Kamala [this bus stops along road 4025]. In Choengtalay, the bus passes by the local police station.
 Phuket – Patong
 Phuket – Kata

Future replacements
In 1990s, Thai government attempted to replace songthaews with modern minibuses. Thai Motor Corporation (THAMCO), BMW, and Italdesign cooperated for designing Italdesign Columbus as songthaew replacement. Italdesign Columbus had bodywork variations, including minibus, pick-up truck, and delivery van.

Gallery

See also

Transport in Thailand
Charabanc
Combination bus
Pickup truck
Tuk tuk
Jeepney
Share taxi
Pesero
Dollar van
Marshrutka
Dolmuş
Public light bus Hong Kong
Nanny van

References

External links
 Public Transit in Pattaya Thailand

Transport in Thailand
Transport in Bangkok
Transport in Laos
Vehicles for hire
Buses by type
Pickup trucks